The South Korean Chess Championship(Korea National Championship) is organized by the Korea Chess Federation, which was established in 2008 after FIDE negotiated an agreement between three rival organizations to unify into a single governing body for chess in South Korea.

Winners

{| class="sortable wikitable"
!No.
! Year !! Champion
|-  
|1
| 2009 ||Erdem Dashibalov
|-
|2
| 2010 ||Jang Kyungsik
|-  
|3
| 2012 ||Kim Inguh
|-
|4
| 2013 ||Ahn Sungmin
|-
|5
| 2014 ||Lee Jun Hyeok
|-
|6
| 2015 ||Kim Inguh
|-
|7
| 2016 ||Martin Walker
|-
|8
|2017
|Lee Jun Hyeok
|-
|9
|2018
|Kwon Sehyun
|-
|10
|2019
|Kwon Sehyun
|-
|11
|2020
|Kwon Sehyun
|-
|12
|2021
|Lee Jun Hyeok
|-
|13
|2022
|Kwon Sehyun
|}

References

Chess in South Korea
Chess national championships
2009 in chess
Recurring sporting events established in 2009
Sports competitions in South Korea
2009 establishments in South Korea
Annual events in South Korea
National championships in South Korea